Sheouak Parr Petaulassie (1918 or 1923–1961) was an Inuk printmaker. She was also known as Sheouak, Sheowa Sheouak, Sheowak Sheouak, and Sheoak Sheouak.

Early life 
She grew up in the Kinngait (Cape Dorset) area.

Career 
James Houston chose ten of her prints for inclusion in the 1960 and 1961 print collections of the West Baffin Eskimo Co-Operative, which she was involved with.

She died of influenza in 1961 at either age 43 or 38, near the Itilliarjuk camp in Nunavut.

Her work is held in several museums, including the National Gallery of Canada, the Canadian Museum of Civilization, the Glenbow Museum, the Hood Museum of Art, the Museum of Anthropology at UBC, the University of Michigan Museum of Art, the Art Institute of Chicago, and the Art Gallery of Windsor.

She and Agiak Petaulassie (an Anglican minister) had six children, including the artist Mayureak Ashoona. Sheouak's granddaughter, Siassie Kenneally (1969–2018) was also an artist.

References 

Year of birth uncertain
1961 deaths
Deaths from influenza
People from Kinngait
Artists from Nunavut
20th-century Canadian women artists
20th-century Canadian printmakers
Women printmakers
Inuit printmakers
Inuit women
Inuit from Nunavut